Joseph Warrington (January 1882 – 28 July 1924) was an English professional footballer who played as an outside right and inside left in Football League for Derby County and Chesterfield. Warrington also played in the Southern League for Brentford, Portsmouth, New Brompton and had a long association with hometown club Macclesfield.

Career statistics

Honours 
Macclesfield

 Manchester League: 1908–09

References 

1882 births
1924 deaths
Sportspeople from Macclesfield
Association football inside forwards
Association football outside forwards
English footballers
Derby County F.C. players
Brentford F.C. players
Portsmouth F.C. players
Gillingham F.C. players
Chesterfield F.C. players
Macclesfield Town F.C. players
Ashton United F.C. players
English Football League players
Southern Football League players
Congleton Town F.C. players
Hyde United F.C. players
FA Cup Final players